Pinball Quest is a 1989 pinball video game developed by Tose and published by Jaleco. Released for the Nintendo Entertainment System, Pinball Quest was unusual at the time of its release for its "unique" mash-up of pinball and role-playing game (RPG) mechanics, and it is considered the "first ever RPG pinball game."

Game play
The game includes four modes: a story-driven "RPG mode" as well as "Circus," "Viva! Golf," and "Pop! Pop!"

Circus (a slot machine-themed game) and Viva! Golf (a whack-a-mole-style game) are additional single-player modes. Pop! Pop! is a sports-themed multiplayer mode that can be played by up to 4 players.

RPG mode 
In RPG mode, the player controls the silver pinball and progresses through a six-level castle to rescue Princess Bali from Beezelbub, the "Dark Lord of the Machine". As in traditional pinball, flippers are used to keep the ball in the playfield and accomplish objectives, such as hitting targets or defeating an enemy. 

The role-playing mechanics are very limited. There is just a minimal character development, consisting in developing a single statistic, but no immersive world simulation, no freedom of exploration, and no active dialogue.

During game play, the player earns gold which can be spent at the Black Market, a store run by imps. At the Black Market, players can purchase upgraded flippers and stoppers.

Below are the six "RPG mode" stages and the notable characters or features in each stage.
 Tomb (the Captain's Spirit, skeletons)
 Gate (Ziffroo the witch, demon dogs)
 Goblins (goblin kids, goblin guards)
 River ("toitles," "Wheel O' Luck," dark knights)
 Harpy (harpy, demon guards)
 Throne room (Beezelbub)

Reception
Retrospective reviews of Pinball Quest focus on the novelty of its RPG elements. The game has been called a "curious mix of genres", with some reviewers describing it in more extreme terms, stating it is "among the most bizarre genre hybrids in the history of video games" and a "baffling experiment."

Reviews
Questicle.net
The Video Game Critic
All Game Guide
Random Access

Gallery

References

External links
 Pinball Quest at MobyGames
 Pinball Quest at GameFAQs

1989 video games
Jaleco games
Multiplayer and single-player video games
Nintendo Entertainment System games
Nintendo Entertainment System-only games
Pinball video games
Role-playing video games
Tose (company) games
Video games developed in Japan
Video games set in castles